Spanish proverbs are a subset of proverbs that are used in Western cultures in general; there are many that have essentially the same form and content as their counterparts in other Western languages. Proverbs that have their origin in Spanish have migrated to and from English, French, Flemish, German and other languages.

Origins
Many Spanish proverbs have a long history of cultural diffusion; there are proverbs, for example, that have their origin traced to Ancient Babylon and that have been transmitted culturally to Spain during the period of classical antiquity; equivalents of the Spanish proverb “En boca cerrada no entran moscas” (Silence is golden, literally "Flies cannot enter a closed mouth") belong to the cultural tradition of many African countries such as Ethiopia; having gone through multiple languages and millennia, this proverb can be traced back to an ancient Babylonian proverb.

The written evidence of the use of Spanish proverbs goes far back in Spanish literature. El Cantar de Mio Cid, written at the end of the 11th or the beginning of the 12th century, is the first instance. Examples of other early works that use Spanish proverbs are the Libro de Buen Amor by Juan Ruiz in the 14th century and El Corbacho by Alfonso Martínez de Toledo in the 15th century. The first anthology of Spanish proverbs, Proverbios que dicen las viejas tras el fuego, was written by Íñigo López de Mendoza, 1st Marquis of Santillana in the 15th century. Also in the 15th century was written the Seniloquium, an erudite and anonymous work containing a compendium of Spanish sayings and proverbs with commentaries. The language of the characters in Fernando de Rojas’ La Celestina (15th – 16th century) is enlivened with the use of proverbs.

Then, of course, in the 17th century there is the renowned book Don Quixote by novelist Miguel de Cervantes. Sancho Panza, Cervantes’ earthy character, is the essential common man. His thinking habitually relies on the authority he vests in the wealth of popular cultural wisdom expressed in proverbs, which he continually quotes. In contrast, his master Don Quixote draws his references from chivalric romance books and is surprised that Sancho can find suitable proverbs for every circumstance. Don Quixote includes many Spanish proverbs. There are Spanish proverbs that contradict others; the “wisdom” that they encapsulate is not, of course, absolute. People will use those proverbs that best conform to their own particular way of approaching life. Taken together, however, they reveal the deep wellsprings of Spanish culture and of human nature in general.

Examples

 Al buen callar llaman Sancho.
 Literal translation:
 They call the person that shuts up, Sancho.
 Meaning/use:
 Recommends prudence and moderation in talk.
 Comments:
 According to some authors, for instance José Mª Sbarbi, this proverb has its origin in a historical episode involving Sancho II of Castile. When his father Ferdinand I of Leon and Castile at his death in 1065 divided up his kingdom among his three sons, including himself, Sancho II remained silent. Soon after his father's death, however, he turned on his brothers and succeeded in dispossessing them, reuniting thus his father's possessions under his control in 1072. The author Correas, however, sustains that Sancho is used as a variation of the adjective santo (saintly) and should therefore be written in lower-case.
 Cada buhonero alaba sus agujas.
 Literal translation:
 A peddler praises his needles (wares).
 Meanings/uses:
 Each seller tries to convince potential buyers that his merchandise is the best.
 In a broader sense, people tend to praise what is theirs, often overstating qualities.
 Used ironically to criticize a person who boasts about his merits.
 Cada gallo canta en su muladar.
 Literal translation:
 Each rooster sings on its dung-heap.
 Meanings/uses:
 Each person rules in his own house or territory.
 A person manifests his true nature when surrounded by family or close friends, when in his own ambience and in his place of origin.
 Cada martes tiene su domingo.
 Literal translation:
 Each Tuesday has its Sunday.
 Meaning/Use:
 Exhorts to optimism, reminding that bad comes in alternation with good.
 Comments:
 In this Spanish proverb “good” is represented by Sunday, a festive day in Christian culture, whereas Tuesday, a week-day of less joyous character, stands for “bad”.
 Cada uno habla de la feria como le va en ella.
 Literal translation:
 One talks about the fair according to how one fares.
 Meaning/use:
 Our way of talking about things reflects our relevant experience, good or bad.
 Dime con quien andas y te diré quién eres..
 Literal translation:
 Tell me who you walk with, and I will tell you who you are.
 Meaning/use:
 According to your friends, mates, etc. you will be either a good person or a not so good person.
 Donde comen dos, comen tres..
 Literal translation:
 Wherever two people eat, three people eat.
 Meaning/use:
 You can add one person more in any situation you are managing.
 El amor es ciego.
 Literal translation:
 Love is blind
 Meaning/use:
 We are blind to the defects and failings of our beloved (person or thing).
 El amor todo lo iguala.
 Literal translation:
 Love smoothes life out.
 Meaning/use:
 Love makes difficulties endurable.
 El mejor escribano echa un borrón.
 Literal translation:
 The best scribe makes a blot.
 Meaning/use:
 Excuses a first-time fault, especially of a very able person.
 El tiempo todo lo cura.
 Literal translation:
 Time cures all.
 Meaning/use:
 There are problems, ills and circumstances that are only healed with the passing of time, either by them being actually solved or by us learning to cope with them.
 Estar como el alma de Garibay.
 Literal translation:
 Stay neutral or undecided in any matter.
 Meaning/use:
 To be like the soul of Garibay is a Spanish locution that means that a person does not have stability, neither fixed place nor adapted to its social, moral nor physical condition. It is also often used to address the vacillating, gaping, unresolved or completely apathetic.
 Origin/Comments:
 José María Sbarbi y Osuna states that “Having died Esteban de Garibay, a celebrated chronicler of Spain, born in Mondragón in Guipúzcoa, the house where he lived was closed for many years, until a family wanted to live in it, however, they gave up this attempt as they heard voices within the walls  of the house.  The noise was so great at night that the crowds and people among the town attributed the noises to the soul of its last inhabitant who was wandering in that place, in order not to be in heaven or in hell. That is why some add to the above-mentioned phrase : that neither sorrow nor glory”.
  When something is lost, it is said: as lost as the soul of Garibay. It is said to be up in the air, like the soul of Garibay who was not wanted by God nor the devil. It is an explanation of the etymology of Garibay, the process of cleaning wheat. More specifically sieves of the wheat, gari,- wheat, and bahe, — sieve, in Basque, wheat purification. Wind winnowing is an agricultural method developed by ancient cultures for separating grain from chaff. It is also used to remove weevils or other pests from stored grain. In its simplest form it involves throwing the mixture into the air so that the wind blows away the lighter chaff, while the heavier grains fall back down for recovery.  The soul of Garibay resides up in the air, neither good (wheat) or evil (chaff).
 La avaricia rompe el saco.
 Literal meaning:
 Greed bursts the sack.
 Meaning/use:
 Greed and excessive ambition can stand in the way of obtaining benefit or success.
 Comments:
 This Spanish proverb evokes the image of a thief using a sack to carry the objects they steal. When the sack fills up, they press down its contents to make more fit in, making it break and losing their whole loot.
 La cara es el espejo del alma.
 Literal translation:
 The face is the mirror of the soul.
 Meaning/use:
 Our face reflects our state of health, our character, and our mood.
 Origin:
 Cicero (106-43 BC): 'Ut imago est animi voltus sic indices oculi'
 La diligencia es la madre de la buena ventura.
 Literal translation:
 Diligence is the mother of good fortune.
 Meaning/use:
 One must be active and diligent in order to achieve one's goals.
 La fe mueve montañas.
 Literal translation:
 Faith moves mountains.
 Meaning/use:
 Praises the power of the confidence that faith endows us with.
 La mejor palabra siempre es la que queda por decir.
 Literal translation:
 The best word is the one left unsaid.
 Meaning/use:
 Sings the praises of prudence in talk.
 La peor gallina es la que más cacarea.
 Literal translation:
 The worst hen is the one that clucks the most.
 Meaning/use:
 It is not rare to see a person boasting and wishing to stand out even though his merits are few and his qualities inadequate.
 La sangre sin fuego hierve.
 Literal translation:
 Blood boils without fire.
 Meaning/use:
 Comments on the strength of blood bonds.
 La suerte está echada.
 English equivalent:
 The die is cast.
 Meaning/use:
 Said in the face of a threatening situation the outcome of which one is unable to prevent.
 Origin/Comments:
 Julius Caesar is reputed to have said Alea iacta est after having crossed the Rubicon river with his legions.
 La vida no es un camino de rosas.
 Near literal translation and English equivalent:
 Life is not a path of roses.
 Meaning/use:
 It's normal to encounter all kinds of difficulties along the road of life.
 Las burlas se vuelven veras.
 Literal translation:
 Bad jokes become reality.
 Meaning/use:
 One should be careful when joking to avoid being hurting or offensive. Burlas and veras when used in relationship with one another, the first means “jokingly” and the second “really”.
 Las desgracias nunca vienen solas.
 Literal translation:
 Misfortunes never come one at a time.
 Meaning/uses:
 Said when several annoyances or setbacks occur at the same time or follow closely one another.
 English equivalents:
 When it rains, it pours.
 It never rains but it pours.
 Similar Spanish proverb:
 Un mal llama a otro.
 Lo comido es lo seguro.
 Literal translation:
 You can only be really certain of what is already in your belly.
 Meaning/use:
 When confronted with a choice between something certain and something uncertain, this Spanish proverb is used to gravitate towards the first.
 Los años no pasan en balde.
 Literal translation:
 Years don't pass in vain.
 Meaning/use:
 Resign oneself to the ravages of time, particularly illness and old age.
 English equivalent:
 Years take their toll.
 Los árboles no dejan ver el bosque.
 English equivalent:
 One can't see the forest for the trees.
 Meaning/use:
 Attention to detail can make one lose perspective.
 Los celos son malos consejeros.
 Literal translation:
 Jealousy is a bad counsellor.
 Meaning/use:
 Jealousy does not lead to sensible behaviour.
 Los tiempos cambian.
 Literal translation:
 Times change.
 Meaning/use:
 Exhorts to adapt to changing circumstances and not indulge in lamentations and useless comparisons.
 Mañana será otro día.
 Literal translation:
 Tomorrow will be another day.
 Meaning/use:
 Recommends to let matters rest and leave for another day and a clearer head the search for a solution to a problem or situation.
 Variation:
 Mañana será otro día, y verá el tuerto los espárragos.
 Nadie está contento con su suerte.
 Literal translation:
 No one is satisfied with his fortune.
 Meaning/use:
 Alludes to a person who is forever dissatisfied with his lot and never has enough.
 Ningún jorobado ve su joroba.
 Literal translation:
 No hunchback sees his own hump.
 Meaning/use:
 Reprehends a person who criticizes others for defects which are also his own, maybe even more acutely so.
 No cantan dos gallos en un gallinero.
 Literal translation:
 Two roosters do not crow in a henhouse.
 Meaning/use:
 Peace is disrupted when two want to impose their authority at the same time and place.
 No hay harina sin salvado.
 Literal translation:
 No flour without bran.
 Meaning/use:
 One can't have everything in life; there are always drawbacks.
 No por mucho madrugar, amanece más temprano..
 Literal translation:
 No matter if you rise early because it does not sunrise earlier.
 Meaning/use:
 Things have their moment; you can be in hurry but you will not get anything.
 No se puede hacer tortilla sin romper los huevos.
 Literal translation:
 One can't make an omelette without breaking eggs.
 Meaning/use:
 Alludes to the effort necessary to achieve a goal and the damage that may be done in the course of creating something new.
 No todas las verdades son para dichas.
 Literal translation:
 Not every truth should be said.
 Meaning/use:
 There are truths one should keep to oneself.
 No todo el monte es orégano.
 Literal translation:
 The whole hillside is not covered in spice.
 Meanings/uses:
 In any endeavor, not everything is easy and pleasurable.
 Indicates that things are not what one imagined them to be.
 Comments:
 Oregano is an aromatic plant used as a spice. It symbolizes easiness, benefit and good, since it was once used as a remedy against many illnesses. The word “oregano” is of Greek origin and means “plant that gladdens the hill”.
 Nunca llueve a gusto de todos.
 Literal translation:
 It never rains to everyone's taste.
 Meaning/use:
 What some find agreeable and pleasurable others find bothersome and annoying.
 Perro ladrador, poco mordedor..
 Literal translation:
 A dog that barks often seldom bites.
 Meaning/use:
 Those who threaten very often likely will not able to carry out these threats.
 Todos los caminos llevan a Roma.
 Literal translation and English equivalent:
 All roads lead to Rome.
 Meaning/use:
 Goals can be achieved by different means.
 Mezclar churras con merinas.
 Literal translation and English equivalent:
 Mix churra with merino.
 Meaning/use:
 Confusing things that are totally different.
 Comments:
 Churra and Merino are two breeds of Spanish sheep, the former excelling at milk and meat while the latter excelling at wool. When they tried to inter-breed both sheep hoping to get the best of both breeds, the outcome was a total disaster.

 El problema es cómo hay más gente interesada que gente interesante.
 Literal translation and English equivalent:
 The problem is how there's more people interested than people interesting.
 Meaning/use:
 There are more people that are interested in others than there are people that are interesting to others.

See also
Paremiology

Sources

References

Spanish language
Lists of phrases
Proverbs by language